The Mokelumne Wilderness is a  federally designated wilderness area located  east of Sacramento, California.  It is within the boundaries of three national forests: Stanislaus, Eldorado and Toiyabe. First protected under the Wilderness Act of 1964, the Mokelumne's borders were expanded under the California Wilderness Act of 1984 with the addition of 55,000 acres. The wilderness takes its name from the Mokelumne River, which was named after a Mi-wok Indian village located on the  riverbank in California's Central Valley.

The wilderness encompasses an area of the Sierra Nevada mountain range between Ebbetts Pass to Carson Pass. There are two sections separated by the Blue Lakes Road and an Off-Road Vehicle corridor.

The highest point is Round Top (10,364 feet), a remnant volcano from which the wilderness area's volcanic soils are derived.

Landscape, flora and fauna
The west slopes have been eroded by glaciation and water down to the granite bedrock which has created a dramatic contrast between the volcanic and the granitic landscapes.

The wilderness protects habitat for a great variety of plants and animals especially on the slopes of Round Top, which is designated a special interest area.  Plants include Ponderosa pine, canyon live oak as well as alpine vegetation of Whitebark pine, subalpine fir, and western juniper, with western white pine, mountain hemlock, and lodgepole pine found in sheltered areas.
Waterways such as the North Fork of the Mokelumne River have riparian zones of white and mountain alder,  creek dogwood, western azalea and bitter cherry.
Wildlife include the black bear and mule deer, as well as martin, bald eagle and the California spotted owl.

Areas of special interest
The Round Top Botanical Area is at the junction of three botanical provinces and includes red fir forest, sagebrush scrub, subalpine and alpine environments. The combination of soil types, varying exposure and elevations produce diverse plant life, such as the phantom orchid (Cephalanthera austiniae), a rare parasitic plant. The plant's common name is due to its color being all or mostly white.

The Round Top Geologic Area has more than  within the wilderness and encompasses a variety of geological  areas, including exposed granodiorite, lava flows, dikes, glacial moraines and cirques. The landform known as Elephants Back is a rounded mass of solidified lava. Mineralization produced gold-bearing quartz veins, and relics of past gold mining activities are still present in the area.

Mountain Peaks
There are several mountains in the wilderness including these named peaks:
 Round Top (10,381 ft)
 The Sisters (10,153 ft and 10,045 ft)
 Raymond Peak (10,014 ft)
 Deadwood Peak (9,846 ft)
 Melissa Coray Peak (9,763 ft)
 Reynolds Peak (9,679 ft)
 Little Round Top (9,590 ft)
 Elephants Back (9,585 ft)
 Fourth of July Peak (9,537 ft)
 Markleeville Peak (9,415 ft)
 Mokelumne Peak (9,334 ft)
 Jeff Davis Peak (9,065 ft)
 Black Butte (9,013 ft)
 Thornburg Peak (8,636 ft)

This is not a complete list and only includes non-numbered named peaks above 8,600 ft elevation in the wilderness.

Recreation

The Mokelumne Wilderness has a variety of recreational opportunities all year.  With landscapes ranging from deep canyons to alpine heights and more than two hundred ice-scoured lakes and tarns, fishing and hiking are popular activities as well as cross country skiing. Access is from roads surrounding the wilderness boundary with Carson Pass being the most used entry point.
The Pacific Crest Trail, the Tahoe–Yosemite Trail and the Emigrant Summit Trail all cross through the Mokelumne Wilderness. The Emigrant Summit Trail is a designated National Recreation and Historic Trail that follows the western boundary and then passes through the wilderness from Emigrant Valley to Caples Lake.

Wilderness permits are required year-round for overnight visits.

Footnotes

References
Eldorado National Forest Interpretive Association website.  accessed July 30, 2009

Adkinson, Ron Wild Northern California. The Globe Pequot Press, 2001

External links
 
  Eldorado National Forest: Mokelumne Wilderness webpage
 Stanislaus National Forest: Mokelumne Wilderness webpage
 Wilderness.net: Mokelumne Wilderness webpage

Wilderness areas of California
Protected areas of the Sierra Nevada (United States)
Eldorado National Forest
Humboldt–Toiyabe National Forest
Stanislaus National Forest
Protected areas of Alpine County, California
Protected areas of Amador County, California
Protected areas of Calaveras County, California
Protected areas established in 1964
1964 establishments in California
IUCN Category Ib